Lochan na Stainge is a fresh water loch on Rannoch Moor, Argyll and Bute within Highland council area, Scotland.

References

Stainge
Stainge
Tay catchment
Lochaber
Stainge